Arkady Sergeyevich Boytsov (17 March 1923 - 15 June 2000) was a Soviet MiG-15 pilot and flying ace during the Korean War, credited with six to eleven  victories. He was awarded Hero of the Soviet Union.

Awards
 Hero of the Soviet Union (14 July 1953)
 Two Order of Lenin (25 September 1952 and 14 July 1953)
 Three Order of the Red Star (1 September 1944, 22 February 1955, and 30 December 1956)
 Order of the Patriotic War 1st class (11 March 1985)
 Medal "For Military Merit" (17 May 1951)

See also
List of Korean War flying aces

References

Sources

Russian aviators
Soviet Korean War flying aces
Soviet military personnel of the Korean War
Soviet Air Force generals
Heroes of the Soviet Union
1923 births
2000 deaths
Recipients of the Medal of Zhukov
Military Academy of the General Staff of the Armed Forces of the Soviet Union alumni
Soviet major generals